My is the debut extended play by South Korean singer Miyeon. It was released digitally on April 27, 2022, and physically on April 28, 2022, through Cube Entertainment. My consists of six tracks, including the lead single "Drive".

Background
On April 6, 2022, Cube Entertainment  announced that Miyeon would make her solo debut at the end of April. On April 8, 2022, the artwork teaser for My was released through the official SNS channels of (G)I-dle. The scheduler and mood film were released on April 11 and 13 respectively. The track list was then revealed on April 15. From April 18 to 22, Miyeon released five sets of concept photos.

On April 25, 2022, Cube Entertainment released the music video teaser for "Drive". The following day, Cube Entertainment released the second music video teaser for the single. The album was released on April 27, 2022.

Composition
The EP's title My has a dual meaning, with it also referring to Miyeon's initials.

The first song on the album, "Rose", refers directly to Miyeon's name as the syllable "Mi" refers to roses. The lead single "Drive" is a rock song about people struggling in difficult situations or facing problems that are hard to handle. Miyeon described it as a song that tells people to keep moving forward. The third track, "Softly" is a R&B song; "Te Amo" follows, which focuses on falling in love. "Charging" is a ballad that features singer Junny. Miyeon stated that the last song, "Rain" (소나기), reminds her of her childhood when she spent hours watching drama shows. She also wrote the lyrics of the track, and bandmate Yuqi participated in its composition.

Promotion
Following the release of the extended play, Miyeon performed "Drive" on four music programs on the first week: Mnet's M Countdown on April 28, KBS2's Music Bank on April 29, MBC's Show! Music Core on April 30, and SBS's Inkigayo on May 1. 

Additionally, Miyeon performed "Te Amo" on two music programs on the first week: Mnet's M Countdown on April 28 and KBS2's Music Bank on April 29. In the second week of promotions, Miyeon performed "Te Amo" on SBS MTV's The Show on May 3 and MBC M's Show Champion on May 4.

Accolades

Track listing

Charts

Weekly charts

Monthly charts

Certifications and sales

Release history

References

2022 debut EPs
Cube Entertainment EPs
Korean-language EPs
Kakao M EPs
Universal Music Group EPs